Cheyenne County is the name of several counties in the United States:

 Cheyenne County, Colorado 
 Cheyenne County, Kansas 
 Cheyenne County, Nebraska
 Cheyenne County, Jefferson Territory

ru:Шайенн#Округа